Little Audrey (full name: Audrey Smith) is a fictional character, appearing in early 20th century folklore prior to starring in a series of Paramount Pictures' Famous Studios cartoons from 1947 to 1958. She is considered a variation of the better-known Little Lulu, devised after Paramount decided not to renew the license on the comic strip character created by Marjorie Henderson Buell (a.k.a. "Marge"). Despite some superficial similarities between the two characters, the Famous animators were at pains to design Audrey in contrast to Lulu, adopting an entirely different color scheme and employing the stylistic conventions common to Famous Studios' later 1940s repertoire, as opposed to Buell's individualistic rendering of Little Lulu. Veteran animator Bill Tytla was the designer of Little Audrey, reportedly inspired by his daughter Tammy (who was also his inspiration for Famous' version of Little Lulu, on which he also worked and for which he directed several shorts).  The original voice of Little Lulu was performed by actress Cecil Roy (who also provided the voice of Casper the Friendly Ghost). Little Audrey was, instead, voiced by Mae Questel, who also voiced most of Paramount's other major female cartoon characters, including Betty Boop and Olive Oyl from the Popeye cartoons.

History

Prior to her adoption by Famous in 1947, Little Audrey had a long career in folklore as the butt of a series of mostly heartless jokes, some going as far back as the First World War.

In folklore and juvenile humor
According to B.A. Botkin's A Treasury of American Folktales:

One of the most famous goes like this:

Pierre Berton, in The Dionne Years: A Thirties Melodrama (1978), offers this example of a Little Audrey joke as was in fashion around the time of the Dionne quintuplets' birth in 1934:

Animated cartoons

Audrey first appeared in the Noveltoon Santa's Surprise (1947), where she was the most prominent member of a multicultural child cast working to clean Santa's workshop while he was asleep, and was briefly seen in the January 1948 Popeye cartoon Olive Oyl for President. Her first appearance in her own series was the short Butterscotch and Soda, released on July 16, 1948. In common with many animated shorts of the period, childlike fantasy played an important role in Audrey's early cartoons, which often used dream sequences as the basis of the storylines. In this way, Audrey could attend a wedding in Cakeland (Tarts and Flowers, 1950), ride the clouds with Mother Goose (Goofy Goofy Gander, also 1950), or face an underwater tribunal of outraged catfish (The Seapreme Court, 1954). Slapstick humor crept into the series with the release of Surf Bored (1953), which pitted the precocious little girl against a hulking, but ultimately brainless, lifeguard. A total of 16 cartoons starring Audrey were produced for theatrical release, several of which were re-packaged for television from the late 1950s on.

She was the only character in the series to have her own theme song with vocals ("Little Audrey Says", by Winston Sharples and Buddy Kaye). Some other characters (and certain one-shots) in the series had their own themes, but were entirely instrumental. Two Noveltoons spin-offs, Casper the Friendly Ghost and Herman and Katnip, had their own vocal themes, but only after leaving the series.

For Little Audrey, the pre-October 1950 cartoons were sold to television distributor U.M. & M. TV Corporation in 1956, while the post-October 1950 cartoons would be sold to Harvey Comics, when they acquired the rights to the character in 1959. Today, they are the property of DreamWorks Animation (via DreamWorks Classics), a subsidiary of NBCUniversal, and distributed by Universal Television. Meanwhile, the Popeye cartoon Olive Oyl for President would become property of Warner Bros. (via Turner Entertainment Co.), and distributed by Warner Bros. Television.

Audrey is one of the three (later four) main characters in the Netflix original series DreamWorks Animation Television's Harvey Street Kids, which was re-titled Harvey Girls Forever! in its second season. Little Audrey has been modernized, as her classic outfit has been replaced by more contemporary clothing. She also has brown hair, which is more akin to the comics, as opposed to having red hair, like in the theatrical shorts. Unlike her comic-book counterpart, Audrey is tomboy-ish and energetic. She is voiced by Stephanie Lemelin. Some of her companions from the comics; Melvin Wisenheimer, Tiny, and Lucretia also appeared in Harvey Girls Forever!

The Famous/Harvey character
Little Audreys last name is Smith."Little Audrey & Melvin and The Secret of Silent Island" (issue unknown), where Audrey's friend Lucretia (visiting her uncle Bruce Bagley) refers to Audrey's mother as "Mrs. Smith".

Little Audrey has reddish brown hair with ribbons making three pigtails (two low and one high). She wears a little dress with puffed sleeves, white ankle socks, and black Mary Jane shoes. In the short subjects, the dress and ribbons are blue, but by the time of her Harvey Comics runs, they are red. In Harvey Street Kids, she wears a pink shirt with jeans.

The comic "Cousin Suzie's Dance Party" (Little Audrey and Melvin #29, March, 1967) reveals that Audrey has a cousin named Suzie, who has a friend named Bubu. The first several issues of the comic book also reveals she has a brother nicknamed "Patches".

In other media
While the jokes remained popular well into the 1980s, the Famous/Harvey character had an entirely different career:

Little Audrey was going to have a cameo in Who Framed Roger Rabbit, but rights to the character could not be obtained in time.

Comic strip
Animation historian Jerry Beck notes that Famous Studios' animator Steve Muffatti drew a short-lived "Little Audrey" comic strip for magazines in 1951, which were syndicated by King Features. These strips were also reprinted in 1952-55 by Harvey Comics.

Comic books
Little Audrey was never as successful as Famous' best-known creation, Casper the Friendly Ghost, but the character had considerable success in printed form. The first Little Audrey comic book series was St. John Publications from April 1948 to May 1952. Featuring stories which depended more on situation comedy than on fantasy, the comics featured artwork done in a style approximating the original Famous character designs (most of them by Steve Muffati). The series met with moderate success on the newsstand, running for approximately 24 issues until Little Audrey was licensed by Harvey Comics in 1952.

Initially, Harvey's comic-book version closely followed its animated template, but the character was redesigned during the mid-1950s to conform more closely to the company's in-house style. The general storyline was simultaneously overhauled to provide Audrey with supporting characters such as Melvin Wisenheimer, her prankish arch-enemy/frenemy, and Tiny''', a young African American boy. Domestic comedy gradually took over the scripts, as Audrey was shown in conflict with parents, teachers, and other authority figures.

Harvey purchased the rights to all of Famous' original properties - Little Audrey included - in 1958, also acquiring the rights to the post-1950 Audrey cartoons. It was during this time that the "definitive" Audrey came into being, taking on the signature red dress and appearance most often associated with the character. By 1960, Little Audrey was the best known of Harvey's female characters due to her multi-media presence (comic books, television/theatrical animation and - briefly - newspaper strips), although her popularity was later eclipsed by the company's other female characters, Little Dot, Wendy the Good Little Witch and Little Lotta.

Later comic series were titled Playful Little Audrey (the name under which the character had been trademarked in 1961) and Little Audrey & Melvin. In the latter, Audrey and Melvin become less antagonistic and Audrey demonstrates affections for and jealousy towards him, much like Little Lulu had done with Tubby Tompkins.

During her most successful period, Audrey starred in at least four of her own titles and was a back-up feature in Richie Rich, Casper, and Little Dot. The character lasted until 1976, when an industry-wide distribution slump brought an end to most of Harvey's line and most children's comics in general. Since that time, the character has undergone several revivals and made scattered television and video appearances, most notably in The Richie Rich Show (1996) and Baby Huey's Great Easter Adventure'' (1998).

Famous Studios filmography
All cartoons listed are entries in the series unless otherwise noted. Credited directors for each short are noted.

References

External links
Little Audrey at Don Markstein's Toonopedia. Archived from the original on November 10, 2015.
Archive.Org:
Song of the Birds (1935) (does not have Audrey but inspired the later adaptation)
Santa's Surprise (1947)
Butterscotch and Soda (1948)
The Lost Dream (1949)
Tarts and Flowers (May 1950)
Goofy Goofy Gander (August 1950)
Seapreme Court (1954)
YouTube:
Little Audrey Riding Hood (1955)

Animated human characters
Child characters in animated films
Child characters in comics
DreamWorks Classics
Famous Studios series and characters
Female characters in animation
Female characters in comics
Fictional characters from New York City
Film characters introduced in 1947
Comics characters introduced in 1947
Fictional tricksters
Film series introduced in 1947
Harvey Comics series and characters
Humor comics
Slapstick comedy